Charles Coste (born 8 February 1924) is a French cyclist. He was born in Ollioules. He won a gold medal in the team pursuit at the 1948 Summer Olympics in London, together with Fernand Decanali, Pierre Adam and Serge Blusson. He finished in fourth place in the 1950 Paris–Roubaix.

References

External links

1924 births
Living people
Sportspeople from Var (department)
French male cyclists
Cyclists at the 1948 Summer Olympics
Olympic cyclists of France
Olympic gold medalists for France
Olympic medalists in cycling
Medalists at the 1948 Summer Olympics
French track cyclists
People from Ollioules
Cyclists from Provence-Alpes-Côte d'Azur